Besha may refer to:

 Besha, Afghanistan, a town in Afghanistan
 Bisha'a (ordeal by fire, trial by fire or fire test), a ritual practiced by Bedouin tribes of the Judean, Negev and Sinai deserts for the purpose of lie detection